In geometry, the metagyrate diminished rhombicosidodecahedron is one of the Johnson solids. It can be constructed as a rhombicosidodecahedron with one pentagonal cupola rotated through 36 degrees, and a non-opposing pentagonal cupola removed. (The cupolae cannot be adjacent.)

External links
 

Johnson solids